The golden grey mullet (Chelon aurata) is a fish in the family Mugilidae.

Description
It has hydrodynamic, very elegant elongated, more or less cylindrical body, with strong tail-fin. It has dark gray back that transit into silver white toward the belly with several grey horizontal stripes. Golden spot is present in gill covers.

Reproduction takes place in the sea, from July to November.

Habitat
 It is present in Eastern Atlantic from Scotland to Cape Verde, in the Mediterranean and Black Sea and in coastal waters from southern Norway and Sweden (but not Baltic) to Morocco. It is rare off coasts of Mauritania. It has been introduced into the Caspian Sea.

Golden grey mullet is a neritic species, usually inshore, entering lagoons, ports and estuaries, but rarely moves into freshwater. It feeds on small benthic organisms, detritus and occasionally insects and plankton.

It prefers sandy bottoms covered with various vegetation and smaller rocks where it can find its food and protection from predators like larger eels, European sea bass, Common dentex and similar predatory species.

Fishing
In some estuaries it is main target of both commercial fishery and recreational fishermen.

Commercially it is caught using special nets for mullets that allows catching specimen that jump over first net line. In sport and recreational fishing, it is often caught on rod and reel, using rigs with floats and hooks baited with paste made out of flour, cheese and fish guts, but sometimes will accept bread, cheese and similar baits.

Cuisine
Meat is white, soft and very tender. Taste depends on fishing location. Golden grey mullet can be pan fried, especially smaller fish. Barbequed with some olive oil, lemon juice and parsley is often considered a delicacy.

Also, it can be used as part of mixed fish stew.

References

External links

Fish of the Mediterranean Sea
Fish of the Black Sea
Fish of Europe
Fish of West Africa
Golden grey mullet
Fish described in 1810
Taxa named by Antoine Risso